Lieuwe Dirk Boonstra (1905 – 1975) was a South African palaeontologist whose work focused on the therapsida|mammal-like reptiles]] of the Middle (Tapinocephalus Assemblage Zone) and Late Permian, whose fossil remains are common in the South African Karoo.  He was the author of a large number of papers on Therapsids and Pareiasaurs, and described and revised a number of species.

Work 
In 1927 Boonstra was appointed Assistant Palaeontologist of the South African Museum and promoted to Palaeontologist in 1931. He remained at the museum until his retirement in 1972. He was the sole curator of the museum's Karoo vertebrate fossil collection for 45 years.

Awards 
He was awarded the Queen Victoria Scholarship by the University of Stellenbosch and received the Havenga prize for Biology from Suid-Afrikaanse Akademie vir Wetenskap en Kuns in 1959.

Publications 
Volume 64 of the Annals of the South African Museum (1974) was dedicated to Boonstra. The 88 publications and books he wrote between 1928 and 1969 are listed in it.

References

External links
 South African Museum - Dr. Boonstra's Publications
 Brief biography of Lieuwe Dirk Boonstra
 

South African paleontologists
1905 births
1975 deaths